Pascal Jansen (born 27 January 1973) is a Dutch professional football coach who is manager of AZ. He played football as a youth, but his career was cut short due to a knee injury.

Early life
Jansen was born in London, England to Hans Jansen and Sue Chaloner. His father is a Dutch musician, and his mother an English pop singer who was a member of the musical duo Spooky and Sue. He moved to the Netherlands at a young age and was raised in Zaandam.

Playing career
Jansen played youth football for AZ, Ajax, Haarlem and Telstar, but retired due to a knee injury before making his professional debut.

Coaching career
Jansen spent his early career coaching in the Netherlands at Haarlem, Vitesse and Sparta Rotterdam, and in the United Arab Emirates with Al Jazira and Al Wahda.

Jansen worked as a coach at PSV between 2013 and 2018, and was manager of their youth team between July 2015 and June 2017. He moved to AZ to work as a coach in July 2018, before being promoted to manager in December 2020, on a contract until the end of the season.

Managerial statistics

References

1973 births
Living people
Dutch people of English descent
Dutch footballers
Dutch football managers
AZ Alkmaar players
AFC Ajax players
HFC Haarlem players
SC Telstar players
HFC Haarlem non-playing staff
SBV Vitesse non-playing staff
Sparta Rotterdam non-playing staff
Al Jazira Club non-playing staff
Al Wahda FC non-playing staff
PSV Eindhoven non-playing staff
AZ Alkmaar non-playing staff
AZ Alkmaar managers
Dutch expatriate football managers
Dutch expatriate sportspeople in the United Arab Emirates
Expatriate football managers in the United Arab Emirates
Association footballers not categorized by position